GASTagus, also known as Grupo de Ação Social do Tagus, is a Portuguese non-governmental development organization (NGDO).

In Portugal the organisation has partnerships with non-profit entities were GASTagus' volunteers develop their weekly activities. Abroad, GASTagus has partners located in different sites of Angola, Brazil, Cape Verde, Mozambique and São Tomé and Princípe, where, during August, the volunteers are welcomed to develop their work and initiatives.

The establishment of GASTagus came from the inexistence of secular organizations which would prepare volunteers for short-term international projects (from 1 up to 3 months). Moreover, some of the founding principles are still valid nowadays in the formation process of the volunteers. Firstly, there is an established formation plan based on non-formal activities which enable the volunteers to think and reflect. Secondly, the necessity of conducting regular volunteering with Portuguese organizations throughout the year. And thirdly, all the expenses associated with the international projects must be entirely fundraised through a series of events organized by the volunteers, without the possibility of them covering their travel expenses.

GASTagus is headquartered at Instituto Superior Técnico - Campus of Taguspark were activities are also held in addition to its branches in ISEG - Lisbon School of Economics and Management, FCT - UNL (Faculdade de Ciências e Tecnologia da Universidade Nova de Lisboa), ISPA - Instituto Superior de Psicologia Aplicada and Faculdade de Psicologia da Universidade de Lisboa.

History 

GASTagus was founded in 2008 by two university students, Nuno Amarante and Nuno Cruz. They were both former volunteers of Irmãs Doroteias, a catholic religious congregation with activities in developing countries such as Angola and Mozambique. A number of factors contributed to the creation of GASTagus:
 The congregation Irmãs Doroteias was no longer developing international volunteering projects;
 There was an invitation to create a social action group in collaboration with an extra-curricular group of Instituto Superior Técnico, named LAGE2;
 The desire to be able to offer an international volunteer experience to a wider university audience, seeing that the religious component could alienate potential stakeholders.
In August 2009, 15 GASTagus' volunteers departed in 3 teams to Benguela (Angola), Cidade da Praia (Cape Verde) and Trindade (São Tomé and Princípe), the latter project being in collaboration with an outside organization.

The following year, 14 volunteers (in 3 teams as well) took off to the previous projects held in Angola and São Tomé and Príncipe. A new project began in Cape Verde with the local organization ACRIDES. 2010 is also the year in which are defined a few core ideas for the future: the term "Caminhada", which describes the ongoing process the volunteers go through, and the 4 "pillars":
 Delivery and Service
 Team and Friendship
 Waiver and Simplicity
 Continuity and Sustainability
Since 2010 the organization has seen an incremental and sustainable growth, allowing more youngsters to participate in volunteering activities. In 2011 the Portuguese-speaking country Brazil hosted the first GASTagus' team and the following year saw the addition of Mozambique.

In September 2013, GASTagus received the Montepio's Youth Volunteering Prize (Prémio de Voluntariado Jovem Montepio) of €25,000.

For the first time in November 2014, GASTagus expanded their activities to other locations beyond their headquarters in Taguspark: ISEG - Lisbon School of Economics and Management and Instituto Superior de Ciências da Saúde Egas Moniz. In 2015 more schools were added: FCT - UNL (Faculdade de Ciências e Tecnologia da Universidade Nova de Lisboa), ISPA - Instituto Superior de Psicologia Aplicada and Faculdade de Psicologia da Universidade de Lisboa. The partnership with the Instituto Superior de Ciências da Saúde Egas Moniz was not renewed for a new season.

Volunteers in International projects

Awards 
In September 2013, GASTagus received the Montepio's Youth Volunteering Prize (Prémio de Voluntariado Jovem Montepio) of €25,000.

References

Volunteer organizations